Joakim André Hykkerud (born 10 February 1986) is a Norwegian handball player for Lemvig-Thyborøn Håndbold and the Norwegian national team.

He competed at the 2016 European Men's Handball Championship.

References

External links

1986 births
Living people
People from Notodden
Norwegian male handball players
Norwegian expatriate sportspeople in Sweden
Norwegian expatriate sportspeople in Denmark
Norwegian expatriate sportspeople in Germany
Expatriate handball players
Handball-Bundesliga players
IFK Kristianstad players
Sportspeople from Vestfold og Telemark